Alfred Verhaeren (Brussels, 8 October 1849 – Ixelles, 10 February 1924) was a Belgian painter known for his portraits, interior scenes, architectural paintings and still lifes.  He participated in the second wave of Belgian Realism and was later influenced by Impressionism.

Life
Alfred Verhaeren was born in Brussels.  He was the cousin of the poet Émile Verhaeren.  He studied at the Académie Royale des Beaux-Arts of Brussels under Jean-François Portaels and Louis Dubois.  He studied still lifes by the old masters to perfect his technique.

Verhaeren was a member of the group of artists called Chrysalide founded in Brussels in 1875 and to which belonged artists such as James Ensor, Constantin Meunier and Frans Van Leemputten.  Chrysalide held its first exhibition in 1876 and the last one in 1881.  Verhaeren remained independent for a while until he joined the Cercle Pour l'Art.  He later joined an association for young artists, which was given the Dutch name Voorwaarts ('Forward') in 1885. Co-founders were Franz Meerts and Louis Baretta. Its motto was: Hooger is ons doel ('Higher is our goal'). What is remarkable is both the Dutch-language name of the association and the Dutch-language motto. Its members included Ernest Hoerickx, Léon Massaux, Emile Rimbout, Jan Stobbaerts, Pieter Stobbaerts, Eugène Surinx, Flori van Acker and Camille Wauters. Later others joined including Theodoor Verstraete, Emile Claus, Adrien-Joseph Heymans, Gustave Vanaise, Victor Gilsoul, Eugène Laermans, August De Bats, Henri Ottevaere and Emile Van Doren. The first salon of Voorwaarts was held in 1885 in the IJzerenkruistraat in the bustling heart of Brussels. In 1888 Voorwaarts exhibited in the Royal Museums of Fine Arts of Belgium in Brussels.  The association ceased to exist in 1893.

Verhaeren participated in numerous exhibitions: in Paris in 1889, in Berlin in 1891 and at the Maison des Arts in Brussels in 1896. At the Exposition Universelle (1900) he won a silver medal.

Alfred Verhaeren died in Ixelles on 10 February 1924.

Work
Verhaeren is known for his portraits, interior scenes, architectural paintings and still lifes. He was a member of the second wave of Belgian Realism and was later influenced by Impressionism.

Verhaeren used a very personal technique: his intense and bright tones are heavily impasted while the surface of the painting, slightly crushed, has the appearance of enamel.

Notes

External links

1849 births
19th-century Belgian painters
19th-century Belgian male artists
Belgian landscape painters
Belgian still life painters
Belgian portrait painters
1924 deaths